
Tomaszów County is a unit of territorial administration and local government (powiat) in Lublin Voivodeship, eastern Poland, on the border with Ukraine. It was established on January 1, 1999, as a result of the Polish local government reforms passed in 1998.

As of 2019, its total population was 80,701, including a population of 19,050 in Tomaszów Lubelski, 2,112 in Tyszowce, 2,139 in Łaszczów, and a rural population of 57,400.

Neighbouring counties
Tomaszów County is bordered by Lubaczów County to the south-west, Biłgoraj County to the west, Zamość County to the north and Hrubieszów County to the north-east. It also borders Ukraine to the south-east.

Administrative division
The county is subdivided into 13 gminas (one urban, two urban-rural and 10 rural). These are listed in the following table, in descending order of population.

See also
 Battle of Tomaszow Lubelski

References

 
Land counties of Lublin Voivodeship